Madeline M. Turner was an American inventor. She invented Turner's Fruit-Press, which paved the way for further development of the fruit press. She was granted  on April 25, 1916 and exhibited her invention at the Panama–California Exposition.

Turner lived in Oakland, California. Her fruit press allowed fruit to be pushed into an opening and cut in half. The fruit would be shifted between different plates until juiced. The press resembled a form of an assembly line. The fruit press was called "ingenious" by a patent review committee member.

Early life 
Turner was born in California.

Inventions 
Turner was granted a patent for her fruit press in 1916. Since then at least 7 other patents from 1948 - 2014 have cited her patent.

References

African-American inventors
20th-century American inventors
Women inventors
People from Oakland, California
Year of birth missing
Year of death missing